Prince Maximilian Emanuel Maria Alexander Victor Bruno de la Santísima Trinidad y Todos los Santos zu Hohenlohe-Langenburg (6 October 1931 – 1 December 1994) was a Liechtensteiner alpine skier who competed in the 1956 Winter Olympics.

Personal life
Being a son of Prince Max Egon of Hohenlohe-Langenburg (1897-1968) and Doña María de la Piedad de Yturbe von Scholtz-Hermensdorff, 3rd Marquesa de Belvís de las Navas (1892-1990), he was brother of Prince Alfonso of Hohenlohe-Langenburg, and thus uncle of Prince Hubertus of Hohenlohe-Langenburg who has skied for the Mexican Olympic team at multiple winter games.

In 1961, he married Ana Luisa de Medina y Fernández de Córdoba, 12th Marquesa de Navahermosa (1940−2012), the eldest child of Victoria Eugenia Fernández de Córdoba, 18th Duchess of Medinaceli. They had 3 children and divorced in 1982:
 Prince Marco of Hohenlohe-Langenburg (8 March 1962 - 19 August 2016), married in Ronda, 1 June 1996, with Sandra Schmidt-Polex, with issue; became 19th Duke of Medinaceli in 2014.
 Prince Pablo of Hohenlohe-Langenburg (b. 5 March 1963), married in Tavera Monastery, Toledo, 6 June 2002, with María del Prado y Muguiro, daughter of Juan Carlos del Prado, 11th Marquis of Caicedo, and Teresa de Muguiro y Pidal, with issue;
 Princess Flavia of Hohenlohe-Langenburg (b. 9 March 1964), married in Seville, 10 November 1990, with her second cousin José Luis de Vilallonga y Sanz, with issue.

Ancestry

References

External links
 

1931 births
1994 deaths
Max
Max
Liechtenstein male alpine skiers
Olympic alpine skiers of Liechtenstein
Alpine skiers at the 1956 Winter Olympics